Kadakkavoor Pachan Brahmanandan (Malayalam:കടയ്ക്കാവൂർ പാച്ചൻ ബ്രഹ്മാനന്ദൻ; 22 February 1946 – 10 August 2004) was a South Indian playback singer from Kerala.

Personal life
Brahmanandan was born in Kadakkavoor, which is located north of Trivandrum district in Kerala, on 22 February 1946. His parents were Pachan and Bhavani. He was the third child of his parents, who totally had eight children. He began to study Carnatic music since a young age, firstly from his uncle Kadakkavoor Sundaram Bhagavathar, and later from the eminent musician D. K. Jayaraman. Brahmanandan was the father of Rakesh Brahmanandan, another Malayalam singer.

Brahmanandan died at his home in Kadakkavoor on 10 August 2004, at the age of 58.

Awards
Brahmanandan has received All-India Radio Award	in 1965, Critics Award in 1999, and Kerala Sangeetha Nataka Akademi Award in 2002.

Career
He also sang for a dozen Tamil films, for composers such as Ilaiyaraja...Santha Kavigal for Tamil movie "Metti" from Director Mahendran and Shankar–Ganesh, and composed the music for two movies, `Malayathi Pennu' and `Kanni Nilaavu'.

"Brahmanandan Foundation", constituted in memory of Brahmanandan encourages projects that promote values in line with particular interests that are well informed, that have clearly defined goals, and that are innovative and risk-taking, while acknowledging traditional standards of excellence and responsibility to the music. The foundation has also constituted Brahmanandan memorial award, for excellence in Music.

References

1946 births
2004 deaths
Male Carnatic singers
Carnatic singers
20th-century Indian male classical singers
Indian male playback singers
Malayalam playback singers
Malayali people
Singers from Thiruvananthapuram
Film musicians from Kerala
Recipients of the Kerala Sangeetha Nataka Akademi Award